

Dusty Jonas (born 19 April 1986) is an American high jumper.

Career

Jonas was the NCAA National Champion in the high jump at the 2008 NCAA Indoor Championships.  At the 2008 Summer Olympics, Jonas finished 26th overall with a jump of 2.20.

At the 2010 IAAF World Indoor Championships, Jonas won the bronze medal in the high jump with a jump of 2.31.

Personal bests

Last updated February 7, 2012.

References

External links
 

1986 births
Living people
American male high jumpers
University of Nebraska alumni
Olympic track and field athletes of the United States
Athletes (track and field) at the 2008 Summer Olympics
USA Indoor Track and Field Championships winners